Haplomitrium andinum is a species of liverwort from Peru. It named after the Andes mountains. The species is characterised by the stem being dichotomous, or at the least the lateral branches are, sparsely arising from the leaf axils.

References

Calobryales
Plants described in 1885
Flora of Peru